JCSAT-5A or N-STAR d, known as JCSAT-9 before launch, is a geostationary communications satellite operated by SKY Perfect JSAT Group (JSAT) which was designed and manufactured by Lockheed Martin on the A2100 platform.

Satellite description 
The spacecraft was designed and manufactured by Lockheed Martin on the A2100-AX satellite bus. It would provide communications services throughout Japan and Asia and for NTT DoCoMo. As most satellites based on the A2100-AX platform, it uses a  LEROS-1C liquid apogee engine (LAE) for orbit raising.

Its payload is composed of eight 54 MHz and twelve 36 MHz Ku-band transponders, twenty 36 MHz C-band transponders and one S-band beam. The Ku-band transponders have a TWTA output power of 110 watts, the C-band of 45 watts and the S beam of 130 watts.

History 
On 30 April 2003, JSAT awarded an order for JCSAT-9 to Lockheed Martin and its A2100-AXS platform. And in May 2003, JSAT leased some transponders to NTT DoCoMo to be used as N-STAR d for its WIDESTAR II service. A hybrid satellite with 20 C-band, 20 Ku-band, and 1 S-band transponders, it was expected for launch in 2005 for the 132° East slot.

On 12 April 2006 at 23:29:59 UTC, a Zenit-3SL launching from the offshore Odyssey launch platform successfully orbited JCSAT-9. Separation from the launch vehicle occurred at 00:38:02 UTC. JSAT had leased some transponders to NTT DoCoMo to be used as N-STAR d. Once in its 132° East orbital position, it was renamed as JCSAT-5A and N-STAR d.

See also 

 Sea Launch
 2006 in spaceflight

References 

Communications satellites in geostationary orbit
Lockheed Martin satellites and probes
Spacecraft launched in 2006
Spacecraft launched by Zenit and Energia rockets
Satellites using the A2100 bus
Communications satellites of Japan
Satellites of Japan